Salimata Madjoh Dosso (born 26 August 1986), known as Madjoh Dosso, is an Ivorian former footballer who played as a midfielder. She has been a member of the Ivory Coast women's national team.

International career
Dosso capped for Ivory Coast at senior level during the 2012 African Women's Championship.

See also
List of Ivory Coast women's international footballers

References

1986 births
Living people
Footballers from Abidjan
Ivorian women's footballers
Women's association football midfielders
Ivory Coast women's international footballers